The following is a list of films produced in Russia in 2017. For a general list of films released in that year, see 2017 in film.

Film releases

Cultural Russian films
 Life (2017 film) is an American science fiction thriller film directed by Daniel Espinosa.

See also
 2017 in film
 2017 in Russia

References

External links

2017
Films
Russia